Marianne Hoppe (26 April 1909 – 23 October 2002) was a German theatre and film actress.

Life and work
Born in Rostock, Hoppe became a leading lady of stage and films in Germany. She was born into a wealthy landowning family and was initially privately educated on her father's private estate. Later she attended school in Berlin and in Weimar, where she began to attend theatre.

Hoppe first performed at 17 as a member of Berlin's Deutsches Theater under director Max Reinhardt. In 1935 she was hired by the controversial German actor and Director of the Prussian State Theatre under the Third Reich, Gustaf Gründgens. They were married from 1936 to 1946, until their divorce. Speaking years after the marriage had ended Hoppe stated, "He was my love, but never my great love, that was work." 

One of the characters in the film Mephisto was reportedly based on her. Hoppe made no secret of her contacts with the Nazi elite in the 1930s/40s, including being invited to dinner by Hitler. Her role in Der Schimmelreiter (The Rider of the White Horse, 1934) made her famous almost overnight, while her "Aryan" face made her a darling of the Nazi elite. Later Hoppe would label this period of her life as "the black page in my golden book".

During her time acting at the home of the Prussian State Theatre, the Schauspielhaus, Hoppe developed her analytical approach to acting, which she stated consisted in her "taking apart every sentence" and giving the use of language a brilliance. This method was to be associated with Hoppe throughout her working life. In 1946 her only child, Benedikt Johann Percy Gründgens, was born.

Four years later after her divorce from Gründgens, Hoppe had a great success as Blanche Dubois in Tennessee Williams's A Streetcar Named Desire, and increasingly played avant-garde roles, written by authors such as Heiner Müller (Quartett, 1994) and Thomas Bernhard, who became her partner in private life as well. She became a favourite of the young and iconoclastic directors Claus Peymann, Robert Wilson and Frank Castorf.

Death
Hoppe died in Siegsdorf, Bavaria, in 2002 from natural causes, aged 93. "German theater has lost its queen", said Claus Peymann of the Berliner Ensemble, whose theatre featured Hoppe's last performance, in Bertolt Brecht's Resistible Rise of Arturo Ui, in December 1997. In one of her last interviews Hoppe stated, "I have a go at happiness every day. That takes discipline, a virtue every halfway decent actor should have."

Awards
 1987 Bavarian Film Awards, Best Actress
 1996 Bavarian Film Awards, Honorary Award

Partial filmography

 The Judas of Tyrol (1933) - Josefa
 The Country Schoolmaster (1933) - Ursula Diewen
 The Rider on the White Horse (1934) - Elke
 Trouble with Jolanthe (1934) - Anna, her daughter 
 Schwarzer Jäger Johanna (1934) - Johanna Luerssen
 Alles hört auf mein Kommando (1935) - Hella Bergson
 Sergeant Schwenke (1935) - Maria Schönborn, saleswoman at Floris flower shop
 Die Werft zum Grauen Hecht (1935) - Käthe Liebenow
 Anschlag auf Schweda (1935) - Regine Kessler
 When the Cock Crows (1936) - Marie
 A Woman of No Importance (1936) - Hester
 The Ruler (1937) - Inken Peters
 Capers (1937) - Mabel Atkinson
 Gabriele: eins, zwei, drei (1937) - Gabriele Brodersen
 The False Step (1939) - Effi Briest
 Congo Express (1939) - Renate Brinkmann
 Goodbye, Franziska (1941) - Franziska Tiemann
 Stimme des Herzens (1942) - Felicitas Iversen
 Romance in a Minor Key (1943) - Madeleine
 I Need You (1944) - Julia Bach
 Das Leben geht weiter (1945) - Lenore Carius
 The Lost Face (1948) - Johanna Stegen
 Second Hand Destiny (1949) - Irene Scholz
 Only One Night (1950) - Die Frau
 The Man of My Life (1954) - Helga Dargatter
 Thirteen Old Donkeys (1958) - Martha Krapp
 The Strange Countess (1961) - Mary Pinder, née Moron
 Treasure of the Silver Lake (1962) - Mrs. Butler
 Massacre at Marble City (1964) - Mrs. Brendel
 Ten Little Indians (1965) - Frau Grohmann
  (1967, TV miniseries) - Madame Brassac
 The Wrong Move (1975) - Mutter
  (1983) - Marianne
 Francesca (1987)
 Bei Thea (1988, TV film) - Thea Ammer
 Schloß Königswald (1988) - Gräfin Hohenlohe
 Tassilo (1991, TV series) - Maximiliane
 Death Came As a Friend (1991, TV film) - Frau Weinstein (final film role)

References

External links
 
 Photographs and literature

1909 births
2002 deaths
Best Actress German Film Award winners
Commanders Crosses of the Order of Merit of the Federal Republic of Germany
Ernst Busch Academy of Dramatic Arts alumni
German stage actresses
German film actresses
Bisexual actresses
People from the Grand Duchy of Mecklenburg-Schwerin
People from Rostock
20th-century German actresses